Marcelo Arévalo and Sergio Galdós were the defending champions but chose to defend their title with different partners. Arévalo partnered Miguel Ángel Reyes-Varela and successfully defended his title. Galdós partnered Roberto Maytín but lost in the first round to Arévalo and Reyes-Varela.

Arévalo and Reyes-Varela won the title after defeating Nikola Mektić and Franko Škugor 6–3, 3–6, [10–6] in the final.

Seeds

Draw

References
 Main Draw

Open Bogotá - Doubles
2017 Doubles